The 1949–50 Lancashire Cup competition was the 37th Rugby League Lancashire Cup. In the final, Wigan beat Leigh 20-7 to win the trophy. Thirty-five thousand people attended the match, which took place at Wilderspool, Warrington with receipts of £4,751. The attendance was the second-highest to date for the competition (for further information see Rugby league county cups). This was the fourth of Wigan’s record-breaking run of six consecutive Lancashire Cup victories.

Background 
Overall, 14 teams entered this competition, the same number as in 1948, with Whitehaven being newly elected into the Rugby League at the start of the 1949–50 season, replacing the prior season's junior/amateur club entrant. No junior/amateur club took part during the 1949–50 season. The same pre-war fixture format was retained, with no bye, but one "blank" or "dummy" fixture in the first round. The second round contained one bye, but no "blank" fixture. As in the 1948–49 competition, all the first round matches were played on the basis of two legged (home and away) ties, and the remainder of the rounds on straight forward knock-out basis.

Competition and results

Round 1 
7 matches (with no bye and one “blank” fixture) involving 14 clubs.

Round 1 – second leg 
7 matches (with no bye and one “blank” fixture) involving 14 clubs. These are the reverse fixture from the first leg.

Round 2 - quarterfinals 
3 matches (with one bye) involving 7 clubs.

Round 3 – semifinals 
2 matches involving 4 clubs.

Final

Teams and scorers 

Scoring: Try = three (3) points; Goal = two (2) points; Drop goal = two (2) points

Tournament bracket 
All the first round ties were played on a two leg (home and away) basis. The first club named in the first round played the first leg at home. The scores shown in the first round are the aggregate score over the two legs.

Notes and comments 
1 * This was the first Lancashire Cup match to be played by Whitehaven as well as being the first match at this stadium.
2 * Wilderspool was the home ground of Warrington from 1883 through the 2003 summer season, after which they moved into the new Halliwell Jones Stadium. Wilderspool remained a sports/Rugby League facility, used by the Woolston Rovers/Warrington Wizards junior club. It had a final capacity of 9,000 although the record attendance was set in a Challenge cup third round match on 13 March 1948, when 34,304 spectators saw Warrington lose to Wigan 13-10.

See also 
 1949–50 Northern Rugby Football League season
 Rugby league county cups

References

External links 
 Saints Heritage Society
 1896–97 Northern Rugby Football Union season at wigan.rlfans.com
 Hull&Proud Fixtures & Results 1896/1897
 Widnes Vikings - One team, one passion Season In Review - 1896-97
 The Northern Union at warringtonwolves.org

Lancashire Cup
RFL Lancashire Cup